Decker Watson (born Richard Decker Watson Jr.) is an advertising creative director turned television executive producer. With a career built chronicling the world’s deadliest professions, Watson honed his skills over land, air and sea in remote locales from Alaska's arctic to the Indian Himalayas.

Watson is best known for television shows such as Deadliest Catch (Discovery), Ice Road Truckers, IRT: Deadliest Roads (both History), Swords: Life On The Line (Discovery), Black Gold (TruTV), The Baja 1000 (Feature Film), Championship Off Road Racing (NBC) and The Hills (MTV).

As the executive producer of Deadliest Catch, Watson has overseen more than 100 hours of highly rated television; often the most watched of the night broadcast. In its ninth season, Watson steered the series towards a ratings increase of 12%  for the premier (over season 8's inaugural episode) with 3.47 million viewers. Season 10 debuted to the show's best ratings in three seasons and continued as the #1 cable show in key demos for all 16 weeks. Between the Telly Awards, Reality Wanted Awards, Real Screen and the EMMYs Deadliest Catch took home eleven trophies for season 10; its most awarded season to date. Season 11 premiered at #1 and remained the top cable show in all key demos for its entire 18-week run ending up over 7%. With 49 million viewers in over 150 countries worldwide, Deadliest Catch is the most popular adventure reality show in history.

Since 2004, Watson has worked on a variety of projects for Original Productions, Discovery, New Line Cinema, HBO, History Channel, VH1, MTV, BET, Bravo and A&E among many others. Watson is currently in post-production on the 1-hour documentary Deadliest Catch: Legend of the Cornelia Marie.

Early career
Watson began in advertising. With a decade of experience on Madison Avenue as a copywriter then creative director, he worked at agencies including Ogilvy & Mather and McCann-Erickson (both New York) then his own boutique shop MadScience Creative (also New York).

His clients included Budweiser, Sam Adams, Dos Equis, Rolling Rock, Burger King, Microsoft Xbox, Sony P2P, Dennis Publishing (Stuff, Maxim and Blender), Coke, Stella Artois, Caffeine Apparel and Viacom (WNEW FM) with annual budgets from $2M to $400M. Watson put his advertising skills to use most recently by directing a viral campaign for Deadliest Catch season 10. One of those spots, Crabzilla, (where a giant CG crab attacks the Time Bandit) garnered Watson a Silver Telly Award.

References

Living people
Year of birth missing (living people)
American television producers
American reality television producers
Emmy Award winners
American advertising executives